Aandhali Koshimbir  (Marathi:आंधळी कोशिंबीर) is a 2014 Marathi comedy film directed by Aditya Ingale and starring Ashok Saraf, Vandana Gupte and Anand Ingale.

Plot
Aandhali Koshimbir is about a lonely father Bapu and his son Ranga and about a lonely woman, Shanti, and her landlord Marne, a lawyer and a bad poet who is in love with her.

For monetary reasons, Ranga and his friend, Vashya, decides to bring home Shanti to meet Bapu to get them to start a quarrel. Because she is more powerful in quarrel, Ranga thinks she will win over Bapu in the quarrel, and that Bapu will lose his confidence, and they will therefore have their problem solved by getting money from Bapu. They tell each of Bapu and Shanti both that the other one is mentally out of control and that their lost spouses were exactly same looking as Bapu and Shanti, and if they come and have a big quarrel, the other patient might get cured. As planned, Shanti comes home to have a quarrel with Bapu, and Bapu prepares to quarrel, too. But Bapu and Shanti fall in love instead.

Bapu invites Shanti to stay at his place for a few days, and the situation becomes more complicated for Ranga and Vashya, and  Marne too, as he can not recite his poems to Shanti. At the Bapu house, all the lonely characters come together eventually and become a family. But Marne becomes increasingly lonely with his poems and becomes a villain. As he learns of Ranga's plan, he blackmails him and lodges a court case against Bapu and Shanti. While siding with Marne, Ranga still helps Bapu and Shanti to get rid of Marne, who in the end becomes insane.

Reception

Aandhali Koshimbir was met with favorable reviews. Marathimovieworld gave it 3.5 out of 5 stars, calling it "a neat and clean comedy". Bookmyshow.com gave it 3 out of 5 stars and had the verdict "A quarreling contest gone wrong."

Cast
 Ashok Saraf as Bapu Sadavarte 
 Vandana Gupte as Shanti Chitnis
 Anand Ingale as Adv. Marne
 Aniket Vishwasrao as Ranga   
 Hemant Dhome as Vashya
 Hrishikesh Joshi as Goraksha
 Priya Bapat as Manju
 Mrunmayee Deshpande as Radhika

References

External links
 

2014 films
2010s Marathi-language films